Kapit Division, formed on 2 April 1973, is one of the twelve administrative divisions in Sarawak, Malaysia. It has a total area of 38,934 square kilometres, and is the largest of the administrative divisions of Sarawak.

Its population (year 2020 census) was 134,800. Ethnically, the population of Kapit Division was 87.8% Dayak people , 7% Chinese, 3.4% Malay, 1.3% Melanau, and 0.3% Bidayuh, and 0.1% other.

Kapit Division consists of three districts (Kapit, Song and Belaga) and two sub-districts (Nanga Merit and Sungai Asap).

Some 86% of the land area is held in forest reserve. The economy is largely agricultural, based on forestry, oil palm, paddy, rubber, banana, and pepper. Other natural resources include coal. The Bakun Dam is based partly in Kapit Division.

Administration

Members of Parliament

References

External links

 Kapit local government
 Kapit Tourism